Médéric Catudal (November 24, 1856 – May 8, 1939) was a Canadian politician, who represented the electoral district of Napierville in the House of Commons of Canada from February 8, 1883 to January 15, 1887. He was a member of the Liberal Party.

Catudal was born in Napierville, Quebec, the son of Toussaint Catudal and Marie-Marceline Poissant. He married Marie-Louise Clara Paquin in the United States on May 15, 1884, and emigrated from Canada to the United States sometime after the end of his term in Parliament. The 1900 US census shows that he was living in Campbell, Nebraska. By 1910, the US Census shows that he and his family were living at 1126 Grandview Street in Los Angeles, California.

External links
 

1856 births
1939 deaths
Members of the House of Commons of Canada from Quebec
Liberal Party of Canada MPs